Georgia is a country in the Caucasus region of Eurasia. Georgia's economy is supported by a relatively free and transparent atmosphere in the country. According to Transparency International's 2015 report, Georgia is the least corrupt nation in the Black Sea region, outperforming all of its immediate neighbors, as well as nearby European Union states. With a mixed news media environment, Georgia is also the only country in its immediate neighborhood where the press is not deemed unfree.

Notable firms 
This list includes notable companies with primary headquarters located in the country. The industry and sector follow the Industry Classification Benchmark taxonomy. Organizations which have ceased operations are included and noted as defunct.

References 

Georgia